Aegae or Aigai, also Aegeae or Aigeai (Αἰγέαι)  was the original capital of the Macedonians, an ancient kingdom in Emathia in northern Greece.

The city was also the burial-place of the Macedonian kings, the dynasty which sprang from the Temenid Perdiccas. It was built on a commanding and picturesque site near the modern town of Vergina.

The seat of government was afterwards transferred to the marshes of Pella, which lay in the plain beneath the ridge through which the Lydias forces its way to the sea. But the old capital always remained the "hearth" (ἑστία, Diod. Excerpt. p. 563) of the Macedonian kingdom and the burial place for their kings. The body of Alexander the Great was to have reposed at Aegae, where his father Philip II of Macedon fell by the hand of Pausanias of Orestis but it was taken to Memphis through the intrigues of Ptolemy I Soter.

The recently excavated palace is considered to be not only the biggest but, together with the Parthenon, the most significant building of classical Greece.

In 1996, the archaeological site of Aigai was inscribed on the UNESCO World Heritage List because of its monumental significance in Western civilization and exceptional architecture.

Tomb of Philip II at Aegae (Vergina)

In 1977, Greek archaeologist Manolis Andronikos started excavating the Great Tumulus at Aegae and found that two of the four tombs in the tumulus were undisturbed since antiquity. Moreover, these two, and particularly Tomb II, contained fabulous treasures and objects of great quality and sophistication.

Although there was much debate for some years, Tomb II has been shown to be that of Philip II as indicated by many features, including the greaves, one of which was shaped consistently to fit a leg with a misaligned tibia (Philip II was recorded as having broken his tibia). Also, the remains of the skull show damage to the right eye caused by the penetration of an object (historically recorded to be an arrow).

The most recent research gives further evidence that Tomb II contains the remains of Philip II.

See also
 List of ancient Greek cities

References

Populated places in ancient Macedonia
Former populated places in Greece
Cities in ancient Macedonia
Capitals of former nations
Ancient Greek archaeological sites in Greece
Bottiaea